The Church of St Andrew in Ansford, Somerset, England, was built in the 15th century. It is a Grade II* listed building.

History

The tower remains from the 15th century building however the rest of the church was rebuilt in 1861 by Charles Edmund Giles.

In the 18th century the living was held by the family of James Woodforde the author of The Diary of a Country Parson.

The parish was combined with All Saints in Castle Cary in 2017 to form a single benefice.

Architecture

The stone building has Doulting stone dressings and slate roofs. It consists of a two-bay chancel, three-bay nave and a north aisle. There is a vestry to the north-east and organ chamber to the south-east. The three-stage west tower is supported by corner buttresses. The tower holds six bells, having been increased from four in the 1990s.

The interior has 19th century fittings except the 17th century pulpit, a chest from the 16th century and a 12th or 13th century font.

See also  
 List of ecclesiastical parishes in the Diocese of Bath and Wells

References

Grade II* listed buildings in South Somerset
Grade II* listed churches in Somerset
Church of England church buildings in South Somerset
Castle Cary